Chip 'n Dale: Rescue Rangers is an American animated adventure comedy television series produced by Walt Disney Television Animation. Created by Tad Stones and Alan Zaslove, it featured established Disney characters Chip 'n' Dale in a new setting. The series premiered on The Disney Channel on March 4, 1989, after the episode "Catteries Not Included" aired on August 27, 1988, as a preview. The series continued in September with a two-hour special, Rescue Rangers: To the Rescue, later divided into five parts to air as part of the weekday run. The final episode aired on November 19, 1990.

On September 18, 1989, the series entered national syndication. It often aired afternoons along with and following DuckTales and later TaleSpin. From 1990 to 1993, reruns were aired as a part of The Disney Afternoon. It was shown on Toon Disney upon that channel's launch in 1998 but was removed a decade later. The entire run became available (as one season) as part of Disney+ as of its launch on November 12, 2019, fully remastered in high definition. The series was initially released on Blu-ray on January 25, 2022, via Disney Movie Club, then everywhere else on February 15, 2022.

A live-action/animated metafictional sequel film with the same name was released on Disney+ on May 20, 2022. From May 19–20, 2022, Disney XD reran the show to promote the film.

Synopsis
Chip and Dale are two chipmunks who start a detective agency, Rescue Rangers, along with their friends Gadget Hackwrench, Monterey Jack, and Zipper. The pint-sized detectives deal with crimes that are often "too small" for the police to handle, usually with other animals as their clients. The gang frequently find themselves going up against two particular arch-villains: Mafia-style tabby cat Fat Cat and mad scientist Norton Nimnul.

Episodes

Except for the five-part set of episodes made from the pilot movie, each 22-minute episode of the series was self-contained. Plot points introduced in each episode stayed in the episode and any character development did not appear to continue through to future episodes. Most of the episodes followed a similar format, wherein the next case was presented at the start of the episode, then the bulk of the episode had the sleuths gathering clues and investigating the situation. In the last few minutes of the episode, the case was resolved, usually in dramatic fashion and the final moments would have a humorous wrap-up scene between the Rangers.

Characters

Main
 Chip (voiced by Tress MacNeille) is the leader of the Rescue Rangers. Similar to Indiana Jones, he wears a fedora and a bomber jacket and frequently uses a rope to lasso or swing to other spots. Chip is fearless, optimistic, and mature and has a strong sense of moral standards, to the point that he is sometimes accused of not knowing how to have fun. He can be opinionated and often ends up in arguments with Dale over his best friend's more lackluster approach. However, deep down, Chip does care for Dale and, at times, he also lets himself go and joins Dale in some mischief. He and Dale have a crush on Gadget.
 Dale (voiced by Corey Burton) is the co-founder of the Rescue Rangers. He wears a red and yellow Hawaiian shirt reminiscent of Thomas Magnum in Magnum, P.I. Though passionate about the job, he is a happy-go-lucky, free-spirited, genial hotshot who is sometimes immature and forgets to think before he acts. He spends his free time reading comic books and playing video games. A known candy addict, Dale has "chocolate attacks" similar to Monterey Jack's cheese attacks (ironically, Monty finds it disgusting that Dale can't control himself over candy). He frequently finds himself being knocked on the head and insulted by Chip when he says or does something foolish, but despite that, Dale still cares deeply for Chip and never holds a grudge against him. Dale is largely a friendly and easy-going character, though he is just as willing to get serious when the situation calls for it. Dale has also shown some remarkable creativity, as he is depicted constructing several gadgets of his own based on one of his favorite movie characters in the episode Double O Chipmunk, seemingly in only a few hours, despite seeming to have little to no technological background.
 Monterey Jack (voiced by Peter Cullen and Jim Cummings), known as "Monty" to his friends and called "Cheeser" by his mother, is an adventure-loving, red-haired and luxuriantly mustachioed Australian mouse who spent years traveling the world before a chance meeting with Chip and Dale during their first case. After Fat Cat destroyed his home, Monty and his sidekick Zipper decided to join the group in their detective work. Stronger and larger than the others—indeed, he has demonstrated feats of strength that some humans would be hardpressed to match—Monty can be quick to anger if he, or his friends, has been offended. This trait sometimes leaves him ready to do battle with a much larger opponent, and the others having to calm him down. Monty has an overpowering addiction to cheese, and the sight or smell of cheese causes him to be almost hypnotically drawn to it in a mustache-twisting, spiraling-eyed "cheese attack". Monty loves to tell stories of his travels, even if the others often stop his reminiscing, and he often uses colorful "pseudo-Australianisms" while talking, such as "Strike me starkers." Monterey Jack is the only Rescue Ranger known to have two living parents, Cheddarhead Charlie and Camembert Kate, who are also travelers. Also, names of his entire family, including his own, have references to various types of cheese. Monty is most frequently found in the company of either Zipper or Dale, whose fun-loving nature matches his own. He also seems to consider Gadget to be something of a surrogate daughter, most likely due to his long friendship with her late father. Due to his traveling experience, Monty often handles the traveling arrangements for the group. Cullen voiced Monterey Jack in season 1, along with 20 of the first episodes of season 2 excluding the five-episode pilot. Cummings voiced him in the pilot, along with 22 episodes of season 2, and season 3.
 Gadget Hackwrench (voiced by Tress MacNeille) is a young blond-haired mouse who is the team's pilot, mechanic, circus performer, contortionist, fabric acrobatics, lyra acrobatics and inventor who wears purple coveralls with blue goggles on her head. The daughter of inventor and aviator Mr. Geegaw Hackwrench, who was a good friend of Monterey Jack, she first met Chip and Dale when Monty brought them to Geegaw's in search of an airplane. At loose ends since her father's death and eager to help, she joins the team. Known to say "Golly" whenever she's surprised by something, Gadget moves, thinks, and talks quickly, sometimes leaving the others looking dazed and confused. In addition to building and maintaining the Ranger Plane, Gadget is the one responsible for the various technological items used by the team, and is regularly inventing new vehicles and tools for the team's use. She has the uncanny ability to take discarded and unrelated items and invent nearly anything with them, which she attributes to the fact that she has a "mind-bashingly high IQ" and is easily bored. Unfortunately, her creations don't always work the way she intends, and have sometimes failed at just the wrong moment to cause the team trouble. Both Chip and Dale are attracted to Gadget, and often compete for her attention, but she doesn't seem to notice in many cases. Gadget's personality was based upon the inventive female character Jordan in the 1985 movie Real Genius.
 Zipper (voiced by Corey Burton) is a tiny bluish-green housefly and a long time friend and sidekick of Monterey Jack, and he is unwaveringly loyal to his friends. With his tiny size and flying abilities, Zipper often handles little jobs that the rest of the Rescue Rangers cannot. He speaks in unintelligible buzzes that only Monty and other insects are able to understand, although, in later episodes, he talks more clearly. Despite his tiny size, Zipper occasionally has impressive displays of strength.

Allies
 Officer Kirby and Officer Muldoon (both voiced by Peter Cullen) are the two police officers commonly seen in most episodes arriving to arrest the criminals the Rescue Rangers stop from escaping with their ill-gotten loot. Kirby is the strong, muscular African-American officer that normally drives their squad car while Muldoon is the skinny Caucasian officer that rides shotgun. Both serve as patrol officers under Sergeant Spinelli out of their precinct where they work with many other officers and detectives as seen in the pilot "To The Rescue", including retiring police detective Donald Drake and his K-9 Plato.
 Detective Donald Drake and K-9 Plato (voiced by Rob Paulsen and Alan Oppenheimer) are soon-to-be retired members of the police force in the series pilot "To The Rescue" as Chip and Dale are good friends of Plato. After Drake and Plato, aided by Kirby and Muldoon, recover the Clutchcoin ruby necklace from Aldrin Klordane's henchman Percy, Klordane and his pet Fat Cat, who Drake and Plato presumed drowned a year earlier, frame Drake and Plato for the theft of the necklace, forcing the police captain to have Drake and Plato stripped of their badges and incarcerated. Thanks to Chip and Dale and the newly formed Rescue Rangers, Drake and Plato's innocence is proven, and they are permitted to retire as intended, with Plato giving his police badge to the Rescue Rangers as a reward for their heroism. Their names are references to fellow Disney characters Donald Duck and Pluto, whom the chipmunk duo has had histories with in the shorts and later projects.
 Sergeant Spinelli (voiced by Jim Cummings) is Kirby and Muldoon's superior officer at their precinct and oversees most cases that the station deals with that don't fall under the jurisdictions of the other branches of the department or are overseen by the captain. He is sometimes on scene with Kirby and Muldoon when they arrest the bad guys the Rescue Rangers stopped. The series pilot "To The Rescue" shows him as one of the commanding officers for the precinct's SWAT team.

Antagonists
 Fat Cat (voiced by Jim Cummings) is a felonious, obese grey tabby cat and one of the Rescue Rangers' most frequent antagonists. Formerly owned by criminal Aldrin Klordane, in which capacity the Rangers first encountered him, Fat Cat became an independent agent and animal-world crime boss after Klordane's incarceration. Inordinately proud of his appearance, he keeps his whiskers clean, wears a purple business suit, and has a taste for expensive things. Fat Cat is a ruthless criminal mastermind, and his plans, though sometimes bizarre, are nevertheless dangerous and sadistic. He hates dogs and several of his schemes have been attacks against them. The only thing he hates more than dogs are the Rescue Rangers, which he always tries to get rid of using elaborate and slow methods, rather than killing them immediately. The complexity of his plans usually ends up being his downfall. He has a cousin who lives in Paris, France. Voice actor Jim Cummings described Fat Cat as a combination of Zero Mostel and Dom DeLuise. Fat Cat is usually accompanied by four henchmen. In spite of their combined stupidity, Fat Cat almost always sends them out to do his dirty work for him, as he is too smart, or too lazy, to get his paws dirty, and they are too stupid and intimidated by him to do anything less than follow his exact orders.
 Wart (voiced by Jim Cummings) is a lizard henchman of Fat Cat who dresses in a gangster-style suit and hat similar to his boss.
 Mole (voiced by Corey Burton) is an overweight mole henchman of Fat Cat who is slow witted but cheerful, and wears an undersized red T-shirt and a yellow hat. When plans go wrong, Mole usually is the one who Fat Cat chooses to use as a punching bag.
 Mepps (voiced by Peter Cullen) is a thin, yellow alley cat henchman of Fat Cat who is dressed in a ratty blue vest and toboggan, and who speaks with a whiny voice.
 Snout (voiced by Corey Burton) is a rat henchman of Fat Cat who wears a short sleeved red turtle neck with a black vest and a dark blue hat that covers his eyes. He is seen the least out of all of Fat Cat's henchmen.
 Professor Norton Nimnul (voiced by Jim Cummings) is the Rangers' other major enemy and a mad scientist who once worked for Aldrin Klordane, which, as with Fat Cat, is how the Rangers first encountered him. Though Nimnul is an intelligent and creative scientist, his plans often lack any trace of logic and tend to be extremely convoluted. For example, he kidnapped all the cats in the city to make an immense amount of static electricity, and in his appearance in the pilot he constructed a laser cannon designed to create a giant gelatin mold which would be used to cause an earthquake under the United States Gold Reserve. Nimnul has receding red hair (and similarly colored, bushy moustache), wears very thick glasses, and a high-pitched laugh. Unlike other humans in the series, Nimnul is aware of the Rescue Rangers' activities, and even that they have human-level intelligence, due to their constant interference in his plans; this becomes even more explicit in "A Fly in the Ointment" when his malfunctioning teleporter causes him to swap heads with Zipper, allowing him to understand the Rangers until they're able to swap back. He is physically modeled on Disney animator Bruce Talkington.
 Rat Capone (voiced by Jim Cummings) is a rat crime lord, named after Al Capone.
 Arnold Mousenegger (voiced by Brian Cummings), named after Arnold Schwarzenegger, is a muscular yet unintelligent mouse that works for Rat Capone.
 Sugar Ray Lizard (voiced by Chuck McCann), named after Sugar Ray Leonard, is an intelligent lizard that works for Rat Capone.

Production
Rescue Rangers was originally conceived as the first of three new companion shows to Disney's popular DuckTales series, which had more than doubled the ratings among child audiences in its time slots after its debut in the fall of 1987. Disney had originally invested $20 million in DuckTales and then invested $28 million in Chip 'n Dale: Rescue Rangers.

It, along with TaleSpin and a third series, Double-O Duck (which ultimately became Darkwing Duck), would round out a programming block later known as "The Disney Afternoon" along with the previously established Disney's Adventures of the Gummi Bears to capitalize on DuckTaless success.

When Tad Stones first came up with the idea for the Rescue Rangers series, Chip and Dale were not part of the show. He initially pitched doing a TV series based on The Rescuers, but Disney rejected that idea as a sequel to that film was already in production. He created a new concept with the working title of Metro Mice. The original draft starred an Indiana Jones-type mouse named Kit Colby who sported a fedora and a fluffy collared leather jacket, and the rest of the team included a chameleon, an earlier version of Gadget and a character resembling Monterey Jack with a different name. When he proposed the show in a meeting with Michael Eisner and Jeffrey Katzenberg, the idea was well received except for the character of Kit. At Eisner's suggestion, they replaced him with the chipmunk duo to give the show some established Disney characters to work with. By late 1987, two years before its television debut, the show was announced under its original proposed title of "Chip 'n Dale and the Rescue Rangers".

While Chip and Dale were established characters, in order to bring them into the series only their general appearance and basic personality traits were kept. Unlike their appearances in Disney shorts, the Rescue Rangers features the chipmunk duo as very verbal, with Chip voiced by Tress MacNeille and Dale voiced by Corey Burton. Audio processing was used to speed up the voice recordings and give the voices a higher pitch, particularly Chip's. The pair were given clothes—Chip the clothing of the original-concept Kit, while the goofier Dale was reminiscent of, but not specifically modeled after, Thomas Magnum from Magnum, P.I. with his Hawaiian shirt.

The series premiered in 1989 on The Disney Channel before moving into a regular slot in syndication the following fall. In 1990, the series premiered as part of the lineup known as The Disney Afternoon, where it ran until 1993. On October 2, 1995, Chip 'n Dale: Rescue Rangers began reruns on The Disney Channel as part of a two-hour programming block called "Block Party", airing weekdays in the late afternoon/early evening and which also included Darkwing Duck, TaleSpin and DuckTales.

The show's opening theme was written (listed in the end credits as "words & music") by Mark Mueller, an ASCAP Award-winning pop music songwriter who also wrote the popular DuckTales theme song, and produced by Alf Clausen. The song performed over the title credits is sung by Jeff Pescetto (who also performed the DuckTales theme song). A full-length theme song was recorded by The Jets, a Minnesota pop group, and released on The Disney Afternoon soundtrack.

Home media

United Kingdom VHS releases
On November 6, 1989, Walt Disney Home Video released episodes from the series on video, containing a pair of episodes each.

North American VHS releases
On February 22, 1991, Walt Disney Home Video released 10 episodes from the series on five VHS cassettes in North America, containing a pair of episodes each.

Additionally, on December 14, 1994, the episode "Ghost of a Chance" was released together with the Goof Troop episode "Hallow-Weenies" on one VHS cassette as a special release called Boo-Busters. On September 3, 1996, the episode "Good Times, Bat Times" was released together with the Darkwing Duck episode "Ghoul of My Dreams" on one VHS cassette as a special release called Witcheroo!

Several other episodes were available on international releases.

Australia and New Zealand releases
Eleven VHS cassettes containing 23 episodes of the series were released in Australia and New Zealand.

DVD releases

North America (Region 1)
Walt Disney Studios Home Entertainment has released some of the series on DVD-Video; two volumes have been released in Region 1 thus far, featuring the first 51 episodes of the series. The first was released on November 8, 2005 (containing episodes 1–27) and the second on November 14, 2006 (containing episodes 28–51). The episodes on the first volume are arranged in production order, while the episodes on the second volume are arranged by original air date. The sets were originally packaged in a box containing 3 slipcases, one for each disc. Both volumes were reissued in standard-sized DVD cases in 2013. There has yet to be any word from Disney regarding the release of a third volume set for episodes 52–65. In 2022, the complete show was released on Blu-ray.

International (Region 2)
In the United Kingdom, Disney released one Region 2 volume in 2007, titled Chip 'n Dale - Rescue Rangers - First Collection. Despite the set being similar to the US version, it contained only 20 episodes, while having 6 language tracks: English, French, Dutch, German, Spanish and Italian. Several other similar releases were then made to other countries, but only going up to episode #20. On December 5, 2012, a second DVD set of the series was released in the UK, but as a Region 2 version of Volume 2, titled Chip 'n Dale Rescue Rangers Season 2. Unlike the first DVD set, this 3-disc set includes a Fastplay mode and only two language tracks: English and German, but subtitles have not been added. As of yet, there are no announced plans to release the rest of the series, or the seven episodes missing between the first two sets.

Video on demand
The series was released on Amazon Video in 2013 and was free for Amazon Prime members. However, it was unavailable for some time. The series was brought back to Amazon Instant Video in the United States in 2016, being currently available for purchase in SD and HD.

The complete series is also currently available for purchase in SD and HD on iTunes and Google Play (Volume 2 on Google Play is only available in SD), also released in 2016.

The complete series was released alongside the release of Disney's streaming service Disney+ on November 12, 2019. There, it is cropped to 16:9 widescreen format, unlike the Blu-ray release (which retains its original aspect ratio).

Blu-ray releases

Walt Disney Studios Home Entertainment has released the entire series on Blu-ray Disc in a 2022 multi-region, high definition six-disc set, keeping its original image ratio (1.33:1). All episodes have been scanned from the original negatives, except episode 32 of season 2 "Prehysterical Pet" whose negatives could not be located. They are not sorted in the original airing order, nor the intended chronological order (e.g., the pilot episodes "Rescue Rangers to the Rescue - parts 1-5" are on disc 4).

Reception

Critical reception 
Hal Erickson, author of Television Cartoon Shows, An Illustrated Encyclopedia compared the show to DuckTales, stating that it was "consummately produced and written" and its animation "succeeded in putting most other overseas output to shame." Emily Ashby of Common Sense Media rated the series 4 out of 5 stars, complimented the depiction of positive messages, citing teamwork and saying the series succeeds to depict a female character as a role model, while finding the show family-friendly and entertaining. In January 2009, IGN named Chip 'n Dale: Rescue Rangers as the 60th-best in the Top 100 Animated TV Shows. Jeremy Hayes of BuzzFeed ranked Chip 'n Dale: Rescue Rangers 4th in their "Best Cartoons From The '80s" list.

Accolades 
The show was nominated at the 17th Daytime Emmy Awards for Outstanding Animated Program.

Other media

Television
 Darkwing Duck (1991–1992): In the episode "Twitching Channels", the voices of Monterey Jack and Chip are briefly heard through an audio-reception helmet-device that can tune into sounds from other universes.
 Raw Toonage (1992–1993): In the episode hosted by Jitters A. Dog, Jitters serves as Dale's stunt double.
 Aladdin (1994–1995): In the episode "Strike Up the Sand", the Genie transformed into Zipper.
 Robot Chicken (2012): The Rescue Rangers appear in two segments of the episode "Disemboweled by an Orphan". In the first, Gadget goes without pants to challenge the double standard of the male characters going without pants, causing the other members to become sexually aroused. In the second, the Rangers pose for a group photo, with Monterey Jack perking up when the squirrel photographer tells them to say "cheese". Monterey Jack and Gadget additionally appear in a segment of the episode "Legion of Super-Gyros", where Monterey gets mad at Gadget for having vegan cheese.
 DuckTales (2017): At the 2019 San Diego Comic-Con, it was confirmed that Chip, Dale, Gadget, Monty and Zipper would appear in the show's third season. In the episode, "Double-O-Duck in You Only Crash Twice!" (S3E3), the Rescue Rangers are first introduced as super-evolved lab animals created by F.O.W.L. agent Black Heron. After escaping from their captivity, they assist Launchpad McQuack in defeating F.O.W.L. agent Steelbeak. The Rangers also make a cameo appearance in the series finale "The Last Adventure!".

Merchandise
In fall of 1989, McDonald's produced a series of Chip 'n Dale: Rescue Rangers themed Happy Meal that included toy versions of the main characters riding small vehicles. Scenes from the series were incorporated into the TV commercials advertising the Happy Meals. Ice cream versions of Chip 'n Dale were made by Good Humor.

Theme parks
 In 1989, Disneyland presented a parade called Hooray For Disney Stars Parade.
 From 1990 to 1993, Walt Disney World presented a show called Mickey's Magical TV World, featuring Chip and Dale in their Rescue Rangers outfits.
 In 1990, Chip and Dale appeared in the Disney on Ice show Walt Disney's World on Ice: 10th Anniversary in their Rescue Rangers outfits.
 In 1991, Disneyland presented a Disney Afternoon-themed stage show called Plane Crazy featuring Chip and Dale in their Rescue Rangers outfits, as part of the park's Disney Afternoon Avenue. In addition, cut-outs of Gadget, Chip and Dale were featured in the Rescue Rangers Raceway re-theme of the Fantasyland Autopia.
 In January 1993, a junior roller coaster called Gadget's Go Coaster debuted as part of Mickey's Toontown in Disneyland. In April 1996, a similar attraction opened in Tokyo Disneyland. The Disneyland version closed in March 2022 for a refurbishment and reopened in early 2023 with the new name of Chip 'n' Dale's Gadget Coaster as well new character figures of Gadget, Chip, Dale, and Zipper.
 Gadget and Monterey made appearances in Disney's Party Express and a few New Year's Eve countdown parades at Tokyo Disneyland.
 In December 2010, Gadget appeared in the stage show Disney's Twelve Days of Christmas.
 In addition, Chip and Dale in their Rescue Rangers outfits were featured to meet fans at the Fall Back to Fun Event in September 2014, along with other Disney characters.
 In 2018, Chip and Dale wore their Rescue Rangers outfits in FanDaze at Walt Disney Studios Park at Disneyland Paris and other events as well.

Comic books

A monthly comic book based on the show was published by Disney Comics in 1990, that ran for 19 issues. Subsequent comic stories were printed in Disney Adventures from 1990 to 1995, as well as in the Disney Afternoon comic book published by Marvel Comics. They also had a series from Boom Studios that was published for 8 issues from December 2010 to June 2011.

Cameo appearances
In the first Darkwing Duck comic story from KaBoom!, Gadget makes a cameo gag.

BOOM! revival

From September 2010, Chip 'n Dale: Rescue Rangers was revived by comics publisher Boom! Studios, as an ongoing monthly series slated to begin in December of the same year. This choice was based on the extreme and unexpected popularity of Darkwing Duck, another Disney Afternoon property which BOOM! revived earlier in 2010. The series featured comics writer Ian Brill, and artist Leonel Castellani.

Eight issues were published, collecting the two 4-part stories into two trade paperback books. The comic series was cancelled May 2011, to be replaced by the launch of DuckTales.

The Boom! Studios series was reprinted in IDW Publishing's Disney's Afternoon Giant in October 2018.

Video games
 In 1990, Capcom released a video game based on the show called Chip 'n Dale Rescue Rangers for Nintendo Entertainment System. It is a platform game distinguishable by the player needing to grab boxes, carry them on top and throwing to attack enemies and sometimes clear or form the path. It features a 2-player cooperative mode, and allows some non-linearity in choosing levels on a map. Each level is a various location of the city. In the story the Rangers must stop another of Fat Cat's schemes. The ongoing is described by dialogues between levels.
 A second NES game, Chip 'n Dale Rescue Rangers 2, was released by Capcom in 1993. The sequel is the same in the principle of picking and throwing boxes, features additional incentives for cooperative play such as mini-games, that can only be played by two players, and the ability to throw the partner as a weapon.
 An unofficial Mega Drive sequel to these games, titled Squirrel King, was produced by the Taiwanese developer Gamtec. This game was later the basis of the unofficial Mega Drive Super Mario World game.
 Also released in 1990, Hi Tech Expressions' PC game Chip 'n Dale Rescue Rangers: The Adventures in Nimnul's Castle saw the Rangers having to rescue Monterey Jack, who is caught in a mousetrap in Professor Norton Nimnul's castle. To rescue him, the chipmunks must infiltrate the castle to collect various parts so Gadget can build a flying machine to reach Monterey Jack.
 A Chip 'n Dale: Rescue Rangers hand-held LCD game was released by Tiger Electronics in 1990.
 In May 2010, Dynamic Pixels Ltd. released a mobile game Chip 'n Dale: Rescue Rangers, where Fat Cat kidnapped Zipper and imprisoned him on a distant island. The team have to repair their legendary plane to get it but, unfortunately, they have no spare parts so the Rescue Rangers have to use their investigating skills together with enterprising skills as only their plane will help them to get to Fat Cat's den. The story is divided into 27 non-linear missions that can be reached via a city map. Every mission is one of 3 different mini-games. The game can be downloaded free of charge and players use micro transactions to purchase in game money to spend it on different in game content like upgrades, additional equipment, power-ups, bonuses etc. if needed.

Other games 
 Chip, Dale, Gadget and Zipper appeared on cards which were in the 1993's puzzle game Mickey's Memory Challenge.
 Chip and Dale (in their Rescue Rangers outfits) are playable characters in the 2000s racing game Walt Disney World Quest: Magical Racing Tour.
 The Rescue Rangers are playable characters in the mobile games Disney Emoji Blitz and Disney Sorcerer's Arena.
 Gadget Hackwrench makes an only-playable character in the game Disney Tsum Tsum and Disney Heroes: Battle Mode.

Film

A live-action CGI feature-length film directed by Akiva Schaffer; written by Dan Gregor and Doug Mand; produced by David Hoberman and Todd Lieberman; and starring John Mulaney and Andy Samberg as the voices of Chip and Dale was released on May 20, 2022, on Disney+. The film also stars Eric Bana and Dennis Haysbert as the voices of Monterey Jack and Zipper while both Tress MacNeille and Corey Burton reprise their roles of Gadget and Zipper as well as Chip and Dale for a brief scene.

Notes

References

Further reading

External links

 
 

1980s American animated television series
1989 American television series debuts
1990 American television series endings
1990 comics debuts
1990s American animated television series
American Broadcasting Company original programming
American children's animated adventure television series
American children's animated comedy television series
American children's animated fantasy television series
American children's animated mystery television series
Chip 'n Dale Rescue Rangers
Animated television series about mammals
Animated television series about mice and rats
The Disney Afternoon
Disney Channel original programming
Disney Comics titles
Disney comics titles
First-run syndicated television programs in the United States
ITV children's television shows
Seven Network original programming
Television shows adapted into comics
Television shows adapted into films
Television shows adapted into video games
Television series by Disney Television Animation
Television series created by Tad Stones
Television series created by Alan Zaslove